Sardar-e Kuchak Ab Anbar (Persian: آب انبار سردار کوچک) is an Ab Anbar (water reservoir) in Qazvin, Iran. Built in 1814, it is one of the two Ab Anbars that were built by two brothers named Mohammad Hassan Khan and Mohammad Hossein Khan, the other being Sardar-e Bozorg Ab Anbar.

It is listed among the national heritage sites of Iran with the number 932.

References 

Qazvin
Cultural heritage of Iran
National works of Iran
Buildings of the Qajar period